20N may refer to:

 20-N, Spanish abbreviation for November 20, the date of death of two prominent figures
 New York State Route 20N, decommissioned in 1962 which stretched from the town of Marcellus to the village of Cazenovia
 Nitrogen-20 (20N), an isotope of nitrogen

See also
 N20 (disambiguation)
 N2O (disambiguation)